Wheatland Manor is a historic home located near Fincastle, Botetourt County, Virginia.  Built circa 1820, it is a two-story, five bay, brick, center passage plan I-house dwelling with interior Federal style detailing. It has a two-level Greek Revival style porch and two-story brick ell dated to the 1850s.  Attached to the ell is a one-story frame kitchen wing.  Also on the property are a contributing retaining wall, site of a terraced garden, ruins of an ice house, and foundation.

It was listed on the National Register of Historic Places in 1992.

References

Houses on the National Register of Historic Places in Virginia
Federal architecture in Virginia
Greek Revival houses in Virginia
Houses completed in 1820
Houses in Botetourt County, Virginia
National Register of Historic Places in Botetourt County, Virginia